Kashalakbash (Käşäläkbaş) is a rural locality (a khutor) in Bayguzinsky Selsoviet, Ishimbaysky District, Bashkortostan, Russia. The population was 58 as of 2010. There are 3 streets.

Geography 
Kashalakbash is located 23 km southeast of Ishimbay (the district's administrative centre) by road. Anikeyevsky is the nearest rural locality.

References 

Rural localities in Ishimbaysky District
Ufa Governorate